Cameron Creek is one of the four main creeks that flow through the city of Visalia and the surrounding communities.

History
Cameron Creek was named after Alexander and/or Monroe Cameron.

See also
Mill Creek (Tulare County)
Packwood Creek
St. John's River (California)

References

Geography of Visalia, California
Rivers of Tulare County, California
Rivers of Northern California